The Victoria Gallery & Museum (VG&M) is an art gallery and museum run by the University of Liverpool in Liverpool, Merseyside, England.

VG&M is located in the "redbrick" 1892 Victoria Building. It‘s marked with “THE ORIGINAL REDBRICK” on the top of official home page.  The building was designed by the Victorian architect Alfred Waterhouse and is Grade II listed. After restoration of the building at a cost of £8.6 million, the museum opened on 28 May 2008. It houses the University of Liverpool's art and museum collections, donated to and created by the university.

The museum is open to the public from Tuesday to Saturday each week and admission is free.  On the ground floor is the Waterhouse Café and a shop. On the first floor is the art collection which comprises paintings, sculptures and ceramics.  Artists represented include Joseph Wright of Derby, J. M. W. Turner, Jacob Epstein, Lucian Freud, Elisabeth Frink and John James Audubon.  A series of special exhibitions is organised.  Also on this floor is the Leggate Lecture Theatre in which educational talks are given.

Tate Hall Museum 
The top floor comprises the Tate Hall Museum which contains exhibits on a variety of subjects, including zoology, medicine, dentistry, archaeology, engineering and oceanography.

References

External links 
 

Art museums established in 2008
Museums in Liverpool
Art museums and galleries in Merseyside
University museums in England
Decorative arts museums in England
Natural history museums in England
Science museums in England
University of Liverpool
2008 establishments in England